Secrets of the Forbidden Spinjitzu is the eleventh season of the computer-animated Ninjago television series  (titled Ninjago: Masters of Spinjitzu before the eleventh season). The series was created by Michael Hegner and Tommy Andreasen. The season aired from 22 June 2019 to 1 February 2020, following the tenth season titled March of the Oni. It is succeeded by the twelfth season titled Prime Empire.

The eleventh season marked a significant change in the format of the show. From the eleventh season onwards, the series was animated by WildBrain Studios in Canada and the "Masters of Spinjitzu" subtitle was dropped. The runtime for each episode also changed from 22 minutes to 11 minutes. The eleventh season also marked the use of new 2D anime-style segments that were included to add new creativity to the show.

Secrets of the Forbidden Spinjitzu is split into two parts titled The Fire Chapter and The Ice Chapter, with each chapter consisting of 15 episodes. Each half follows a separate plot, which combine to form an entire story arc. The Fire Chapter focuses on the threat of a new antagonist named Aspheera and her army of Pyro Vipers. The season introduces a new power called "Forbidden Spinjitzu" which is wielded by both Aspheera and the main ninja characters. Secrets of the Forbidden Spinjitzu also introduces the character Clutch Powers into the Ninjago universe, which was a pre-existing Lego character from the 2010 animated film Lego: The Adventures of Clutch Powers. The first half of the season ends in a cliffhanger, in which the character Zane is lost in another realm and the ninja characters decide to travel across the realms to find him. The Ice Chapter continues the storyline from the first half of the season. It introduces one of the 16 fictional realms in the Ninjago universe, the Never-Realm, and follows the storyline of the ninja and their search for Zane.

Voice cast

Main 

 Sam Vincent as Lloyd Garmadon, the Green Ninja
 Vincent Tong as Kai, the red ninja, Elemental Master of Fire and Nya's Brother.
 Michael Adamthwaite as Jay, the blue ninja, Elemental Master of Lightning, and Nya's Yang/Boyfriend.
 Brent Miller as Zane, the white ninja and Elemental Master of Ice
 Kirby Morrow as Cole, the black ninja and Elemental Master of Earth
 Kelly Metzger as Nya, the Elemental Master of Water, Kai's sister, and Jay's Yin/Girlfriend.
 Paul Dobson as Sensei Wu, the wise teacher of the ninja
 Jennifer Hayward as P.I.X.A.L. a female nindroid
Pauline Newstone as Aspheera
Tabith St Germain as Akita

Supporting 

Brian Drummond as Char
Michael Kopsa as Vex
 Michael Donovan as Police Commissioner
 Kelly Sheridan as Gayle Gossip
Paul Dobson as Warden Noble
Ian James Corlett as Clutch Powers
Gary Chalk as Killow/Director
Paul Dobson as Cecil Putnam
Michael Adamthwaite as Smythe
Brian Drummond as Shippleton
Sam Vincent as Dwayne
Brynna Drummond as Antonia
David Raynolds as Nelson
Ian Hanlin as Dan Vaapit
Alan Marriott as Dareth
Bill Newton as Fred Finely
Ian James Corlett as Scales
Paul Dobson as Acidicus
Jim Conrad as the First Spinjitzu Master
Madyx Whiteway as Young Wu
Dean Petriw as Young Garmadon
Michael Antonakos as The Mechanic
Adrian Petriw as Fugi Dove
Sharon Alexander as Ultra Violet

 Cole Howard as Kataru
Michael Dobson as King Mambo
 Ashleigh Ball as Young Aspheera
 Patty Drake as Sorla
 Brian Drummond as Grimfax
Brian Drummond as Krag

Production

Animation 
From the eleventh season, the animation for the series was produced in Canada at WildBrain Studios, whereas it had previously been animated by Wil Film ApS in Denmark.

Secrets of the Forbidden Spinjitzu was the first season in the Ninjago series to mix animation styles between a 2D and 3D animation format. The season incorporates non-minifigure 2D animated anime-style segments in the show. These changes were announced at the San Diego Comic Con 2019 by Jason Cosler and Robert May of The Lego Group. Executive Producer Tommy Andreasen confirmed the changes on Twitter, stating, "to clarify, the Ninjago series will still be 3d mini-fig based…but once in a while, if the story motivates it, we will be doing episodes in different styles. Ninjago is playground for creativity and fun."

Format 
The eleventh season marked significant changes in the format of the show. The Masters of Spinjitzu subtitle was dropped, so that the series would be simply titled Ninjago. The new format also included a change in the long-standing episode runtime from 22 minutes to 11 minutes. The reduction to 11 minutes resulted in a brisker pace to the storyline. Bragi Schut continued as the writer for the series, having replaced the original writers Dan and Kevin Hageman in the tenth season. With the announcement of this change, The Lego Group stated, "The upcoming TV season will have 30 episodes of 11 minutes each, making it the ninjas' biggest adventure yet. The season picks up shortly after 'March of the Oni' and remains true to the story canon and the characters. This is not a reboot, nor a spin-off, but merely a brand-new adventure. A fresh beginning helps new viewers to watch and discover the magic of Ninjago without knowing much about the 100 episodes prior." The announcement further explained, "Whereas the first chapter was heavily tied to a 22 min serialized TV format, this next chapter will not be confined to a specific format. The 11 min episodes allow for new and creative possibilities for the storytelling. Also, with the growth of exciting story formats like comics, in-world books etc. that are extending the Ninjago universe, this new chapter will be more exploratory and creative." The change in the episode runtime was a particular cause of concern with fans of the show. Co-creator Tommy Andreasen explained that the 11 minute format, "was a way for the broadcasters to make it easier to programme". He also commented, "Once you're working with 11 minutes it's not just the same idea stretched over two 11s. Now it's a new idea in every episode, and it really makes you risky and fresh - and able to tell stories very efficiently...If there's something I would like Ninjago TV show to be, it's this creative playground, where you should never know exactly what you can expect".

Release 
The first 60-second teaser trailer for the season was released on 26 May 2019 on the Lego YouTube channel. A trailer for The Ice Chapter was later released on 6 September 2019 on the Lego YouTube channel to promote the second half of the season. The season premiered on Cartoon Network on 22 June 2019 with the release of the first episode titled Wasted True Potential. The Fire Chapter episodes were released throughout June, July and August 2019 and ended on 10 August 2019 with the release of A Cold Goodbye. The Ice Chapter was released on 14 December 2019 with the release of the episode titled The Never-Realm. The Ice Chapter continued throughout December 2019 and January 2020 until the season finale titled Awakenings was released on 1 February of the same year.

Plot

The Fire Chapter 
After defeating the Oni, the ninja have become lazy and out of shape. They decide to search for a new threat to face, but Ninjago is at peace. They find their next quest when Clutch Powers discovers an ancient pyramid. The tomb is a prison for a snake queen named Aspheera, who is unwittingly released by the ninja. She steals Kai's powers and uses them to revive her army of Pyro Vipers, with the aim of conquering Ninjago and exacting revenge on the "Treacherous Deceiver". The ninja are trapped in the pyramid, but rescued by P.I.X.A.L. They learn about the Scrolls of Forbidden Spinjitzu, which grant the user great powers, but can also corrupt them. Wu eventually admits that he is the "Treacherous Deceiver", and explains that he befriended Aspheera and taught her Spinjitzu, but she used it for evil by taking over the Serpentine. As a result, Wu and Garmadon were forced to defeat Aspheera using Forbidden Spinjitzu and imprisoned her inside the pyramid. After Aspheera steals one of the scrolls from the museum, the ninja go after the other at the Explorers Club, while Aspheera attacks the Monastery of Spinjitzu. The ninja defeat Aspheera, but Zane is hit with the scroll's power and is transported to the Never-Realm. Wu volunteers to rescue Zane, but the ninja overpower him and go instead, before Wu can warn them that there is no way to return.

The Ice Chapter 
The ninja reach the Never-Realm and arrive at a village, where they meet the elder, Sorla and help the locals fend off the Blizzard Samurai, led by the Ice Emperor and his advisor, Vex. The ninja believe that Zane was captured by the Ice Emperor and decide to stay at the village, where Kai attempts to regain his powers. Cole leaves to find the Traveller's Tree to collect some leaves for the Traveller's Tea so that they can return home. He befriends Krag, the last surviving yeti, and Lloyd leaves to find Zane's mech. Along the way, Lloyd befriends a Formling named Akita, who can transform into a wolf and wishes to exact revenge on the Ice Emperor for freezing her people. Meanwhile, the village is attacked by the Ice Emperor's dragon Boreal, forcing the remaining ninja to flee and continue their journey. Lloyd and Akita are later attacked by Boreal, who kidnaps Lloyd and carries him to the Ice Emperor, who is revealed to be Zane. After being transported to the Never-Realm decades into the past, he lost his memory and was manipulated by Vex, a Formling who wished to exact revenge on his people. Zane was led to believe he was the Ice Emperor and the two then dethroned the ruler of the realm, Grimfax. Zane used the Scroll of Forbidden Spinjitzu to corrupt Grimfax's warriors, turning them into the Blizzard Samurai. Lloyd is locked in a cell and meets Akita's brother, Kataru. They form an alliance with Grimfax to dethrone Zane and liberate the Never-Realm. Kai recovers his powers, destroying Boreal, and Zane recovers his memories after Vex attempts to kill Lloyd. Zane destroys his sceptre, which restores peace to the Never-Realm. Grimfax regains his throne, Vex is banished for his crimes, and the ninja return to Ninjago.

Episodes

Reception 
Dan Bradley for TheHDRoom commented on the duality of the season, specifically in terms of the split structure that presents the Pyro Vipers (or fire serpents) and the Blizzard Samurai (or ice warriors) as the two groups of antagonists. This split theme of fire and ice was compared to Game of Thrones and A Song of Ice and Fire.

Accolades 
In 2020, Secrets of the Forbidden Spinjitzu was nominated for two awards in the Animation Series category of the Leo Awards for Art Direction and Sound.

References

Primary

Secondary 

Secrets of the Forbidden Spinjitzu
2019 Canadian television seasons
2019 Danish television seasons
Split television seasons